Suzette Martinez Valladares (born December 21, 1980) is an American politician who served as a member of the California State Assembly from the 38th district, which included the Santa Clarita Valley and Simi Valley. Elected in 2020, she assumed office on December 7, 2020. In 2022, she ran in the newly redrawn 40th Assembly district, and narrowly lost the election to Pilar Schiavo by a 50.2% to 49.8% margin.

Early life and education 
Valladares was born in Sylmar, Los Angeles and graduated from Sylmar High School in 1999. A third-generation Californian, her grandfather was a farmworker who worked alongside Cesar Chavez in vineyards near Bakersfield. She earned an associate degree from the College of the Canyons and a Bachelor of Arts degree in political science from California State University, Northridge.

Career 
From 2009 to 2012, Valladares was a district representative for Congressman Buck McKeon. In 2014, she was a candidate for the 36th district in the California State Assembly. In 2014 and 2015, she worked as the California Director of Hispanic Initiatives for the Republican National Committee. From 2015 to 2018, she was the executive director of Southern California Autism Speaks. In 2018, she was a candidate for California's 25th congressional district before withdrawing from the race to run for state assembly.

In 2020, Valladares became one of two Republican nominees for the 38th district in the California State Assembly after incumbent Democrat Christy Smith announced that she would not seek re-election and instead focus on her run for the United States House of Representatives against Mike Garcia. Valladares placed first in the nonpartisan blanket primary and defeated fellow Republican Lucie Lapointe Volotzky, a furniture store owner, in the November general election.

In 2021, Valladares became one of the inaugural members of the California State Legislature's "Problem Solvers Caucus," a bipartisan group consisting of members of both the State Assembly and State Senate.  The Problem Solvers Caucus says that their goal is to, "create a group of legislators committed more to progress than to ideology."

Personal life 
Valladares and her husband, Shane, have one daughter and live in Santa Clarita, California.

References

External links

Living people
1980 births
People from Sylmar, Los Angeles
Politicians from Los Angeles
College of the Canyons alumni
California State University, Northridge alumni
Republican Party members of the California State Assembly
Women state legislators in California
21st-century American politicians
21st-century American women politicians
American politicians of Mexican descent